Garbi may refer to:

People
Joly Garbi, Greek actress
Katy Garbi, Greek singer
Nabil Al-Garbi, Yemeni middle-distance runner

Places
Garbi (mountain), mountain in Djibouti

See also 
 Garbis, a given name and surname